Abzelilovsky District (Äbyälil rayonı) is an administrative and municipal district (raion), one of the fifty-four in the Republic of Bashkortostan, Russia. It is located in the southeast of the republic. Its administrative center is the rural locality (a selo) of Askarovo. As of the 2010 Census, the total population of the district was 45,551, with the population of Askarovo accounting for 16.8% of that number.

Geography

About a quarter of the district's territory is covered by forests, and there are thirty-three lakes and many rivers. The district is rich in minerals, including copper, marble, jasper, and limestone.

History
The district was established in 1930.

Administrative and municipal status
Within the framework of administrative divisions, Abzelilovsky District is one of the fifty-four in the Republic of Bashkortostan. The district is divided into fifteen selsoviets, comprising ninety-one rural localities. As a municipal division, the district is incorporated as Abzelilovsky Municipal District. Its fifteen selsoviets are incorporated as fifteen rural settlements within the municipal district. The selo of Askarovo serves as the administrative center of both the administrative and municipal district.

Demographics

In terms of ethnic composition, 88% of the population are Bashkirs, 8.4% are Russians, and 2% are Tatars.

References

Notes

Sources

 
Districts of Bashkortostan
States and territories established in 1930